"To Play Some Music" is the first single released by the American rock group Journey. It originally appeared as the fourth track on the band's eponymous 1975 debut album.

Album and single release

The album Journey was released as the band's first LP by Columbia Records on April 1, 1975. Two months later, Columbia also issued the band's first single. "To Play Some Music" was chosen as the A-side, while the B-side featured another cut from Journey, the instrumental fifth track "Topaz" ("Topaz" followed "To Play Some Music" on the album running order). "To Play Some Music" was written by Gregg Rolie and Neal Schon, while "Topaz" was penned by George Tickner.

Journey would ultimately peak at #138 on The Billboard 200 album chart in the United States and also at #72 in Japan. However, "To Play Some Music" has never appeared on any major singles chart Worldwide. It was the only single issued from the band's debut album.

Cash Box said that "from its opening organ riffs clean through to its rocking solo parts, Journey explodes with a solid, tightly produced disk."

Personnel
Neal Schon – lead guitar
George Tickner – rhythm guitar
Gregg Rolie – keyboards, vocals
Ross Valory – bass guitar
Aynsley Dunbar – drums

References

1975 debut singles
1975 songs
Columbia Records singles
Journey (band) songs
Song recordings produced by Roy Halee
Songs written by Gregg Rolie
Songs written by Neal Schon